Eduardo Conget Salvatierra (born 22 June 1977 in Tudela, Navarre) is a Spanish retired footballer who played as a midfielder.

External links

1977 births
Living people
People from Tudela, Navarre
Spanish footballers
Footballers from Navarre
Association football midfielders
Segunda División players
Segunda División B players
Tercera División players
CA Osasuna B players
CA Osasuna players
CD Ourense footballers
Burgos CF footballers
Gimnàstic de Tarragona footballers
FC Cartagena footballers
CD Puertollano footballers
UD Melilla footballers
CD Izarra footballers